KBON (101.1 FM) is a radio station broadcasting an Americana format, deeply rooted in the music of south Louisiana, including swamp pop, zydeco, and cajun-French music mixed in with some traditional oldies, country-western, and R&B music. Licensed to Mamou, Louisiana, the station serves rural portions of both the Lafayette and Alexandria radio markets. Its studios are located in downtown Eunice, Louisiana.

History
The station went on the air in late 1997. KBON was originally assigned the calls KAHK-FM as a construction permit in 1994, but changed to KBON shortly before signing on.

History of call letters
The call letters KBON previously were assigned to an AM station in Omaha, Nebraska. It began broadcasting March 1, 1941, on 1400 kHz with 250 W power (full-time).

References

External links

French-American culture in Louisiana
Radio stations in Louisiana